The Nissan A series of internal combustion gasoline engines have been used in Datsun, Nissan and Premier brand vehicles. Displacements of this four-stroke engine family ranged from 1.0-liter to 1.5-liter and have been produced from 1967 till 2009. It is a small-displacement four-cylinder straight engine. It uses a lightweight cast iron block and an aluminum cylinder head, with overhead valves actuated by pushrods.

The Nissan A engine design is a refined, quiet and durable gasoline engine. It appears to be a modern replacement of the earlier iron-headed Nissan C and Nissan E engines and is of similar dimensions. The 1960s E series was an all-new design from newly acquired Aichi Kokuki, and integrated Nissan's improvements to the BMC B-Series engine design of the 1950s (Nissan was a licensee of Austin Motor Company technology), mainly comprising changing the camshaft from the left side to the right side so removing the intrusion of the pushrods from the porting allowing 8 individual ports instead of 5 originally, and moving the oil pump from the rear of the camshaft to the right side of the block. As production continued, 1974 and newer A-series engines had different block castings, with relocated motor mount bosses.



A10: the first A-series engine
The A10 is a 1.0-liter (988 cc) engine, released in September 1966 in the 1967 model year Datsun 1000. The A10 featured a three main bearing crankshaft. Bore was 73 mm and stroke was 59 mm (same as the Nissan C engine). The Datsun 1000 Coupé, introduced in Sept 1968, was equipped with an uprated A10 engine boasting a free flowing dual outlet exhaust manifold with increased compression, now 9 to 1. With a revised carburetor, this engine produced .

A belt-driven SOHC version of the A10 was built as the E10 into the early nineties.

Applications
 1967–1970 Nissan Sunny (B10, B20; Datsun 1000)
 1971–1976 Nissan Cherry (E10; Datsun 100A)
 1974–1978 Nissan Cherry F-II (F10)
 1978–1981 Nissan Pulsar/Cherry (N10)

A12 (1200): further refinements
With five main bearings on a forged steel crankshaft, the engine is extremely smooth and durable. The two-barrel (twin-choke) Hitachi carburettor was significantly improved with the addition of a power valve circuit. The A12 engine produced  and   torque.

A special version of the A12 called the "A12 GX" engine, was available (A12GX or A12T for front-wheel drive applications). With twin Hitachi sidedraft carburetors, a longer duration camshaft and 10:1 compression ratio, it delivered  at 6400 rpm, up 20 percent from a standard A12 engine. The GX engine was offered in Japanese Domestic Market Nissan Sunny 1200 GX sedans and coupes. The identical specification A12T engine was offered in the front-wheel-drive Nissan Cherry X-1.

An overbored version of the A12 was used in period race cars, including Nissan factory (works) racing Sunnys. These legendary engines competed in Japan's Touring Sedan (TS) class races against the 1200s archrival Toyota Starlet.

Perhaps the most interesting variety of A series engines was the AY12 engine. This was a special race-only Nissan factory (works) racing version with a crossflow cylinder head.

The AY12 was used in an under -class with a  bore diameter. The pistons were also a special design and the valve rocker system was different from the standard A12 due to the use of a crossflow layout for the racing engine.

Applications
 1970–1973 Nissan Sunny B110, and B120 (Nissan Sunny Truck)
 1971–1973 Nissan Cherry E10 (Datsun 120A)
 1970 Nissan 270X concept
 1985-2001 Premier 118NE (Fiat 124)

1974 redesign
For the 1974 model year, the A engine was modified, and all subsequent A engines use the new block style. Since there was increasing need for accessories like air conditioning, anti-pollution air pumps and the like, the distributor was moved from the front side of the engine to the middle of the block to make room for these accessories.  Additionally, the motor mount positions were moved slightly. Nissan introduced its emission control technology, called NAPS (Nissan NAPS) with the redesign.

This "new" A12 retained the same bore, stroke and most other specifications of the previous A12.

Applications
 1974–1978 Nissan Sunny B210 (Datsun 120Y) (not used in the US model B-210)
 1974–1976 Nissan Cherry E10 (Datsun 120A)
 1977.11-1982 Nissan Sunny B310 (Datsun 120Y) (not used in the US model 210)
 1974–1995 Nissan Sunny Truck
 1978–1982 Nissan Pulsar N10 / Nissan Cherry N10 (Datsun 120A)
 1978–1988 Nissan Vanette (C120) –  at 5,400 rpm (called Datsun Vanette/Nissan Sunny Vanette/Nissan Cherry Vanette, depending on dealership channel)
 Premier 118NE sedan, made by Premier in India

A12A
The A12A is a 1.2-liter (1,237 cc) engine. It used a casting similar to the A12 and same stroke, but used a 75 mm bore (up from 73 mm), for an increase of 66 cc capacity. It too was of an overhead valve design. The A12A also uses a different (stronger) conrod with a larger diameter gudgeon pin.

The A12A shared a common block and crankshaft with the redesigned A12 and A13 engines.

Applications
 1977.11–1980.11 Datsun Sunny B310 –  at 6000 rpm
 1979–1982 "Datsun 210", USA and Canada version of Sunny B310.
 1974–1979 “Nissan Cherry” Second generation (F10, F-II)
 1978–1982 “Datsun Cherry” Third generation (N10)

A13 (1974): the first tall-deck A engine
The 1974 A13 is a 1.3-liter (1288 cc) engine with 73 mm bore like the A10 and A12 above, but stroke increased to 77 mm, and compression ratio reduced to 8.5:1. This engine features a "tall-block" with a deck height  higher than previous A-series engines.

Applications

 1974 Nissan Sunny Datsun B-210 (USA and Canada)

An important fact is that this model only existed in the 1974 model year.

A13 (1979–1982) – short-deck engine 
The redesigned A13 is a 1.3-liter engine. It used the same basic block casting as the A12 and same stroke of 70 mm, but used a 76 mm bore for a displacement of 1,270 cc. This engine was also used as the basis for a number of Formula Pacific and Formula 3 race engines.

Applications
 1980–1982 Nissan Sunny B310

A14
The A14 is a 1.4-liter (1397 cc) engine produced from the 1975 Model year through 2008. The bore was increased to 76 mm, up from 73 mm of previous A-series engines. Like the previous A13 engine, the A14 is a "tall-block" variant.

A twin-carburetor "GX" version of this engine (A14T) was available in some markets.

Applications
 1975–1978 Nissan Sunny B210 (140Y or B-210)
 1976-1978 Nissan/Datsun F-10
 1977.11-1982 Datsun Sunny HB310 (aka Datsun 140Y or Datsun 210)
 1977–1982 Nissan Pulsar N10 (aka Datsun/Nissan Cherry, Datsun 310) 92 PS (JDM)
 1977–1981 Nissan Stanza/Auster/Violet, 80 PS (JDM)
 1978–1988 Nissan Vanette (PC120) –  at 5400 rpm (originally only in 'Coach' passenger versions)
 1982–2008 Nissan 1400 LDV (model B140. Only sold in South Africa).
 Datsun Forklift models (including turbocharged variant). Replaced the A15 normally aspirated engine due to emission controls implemented in the Asian markets.

A fuel-injected version (A14E) was offered in Asian markets in the B310.

A15 – Stroker motor

The A15 is a 1.5-liter (1,487 cc) engine produced from 1979 till 2009 where it was used in the Malaysian Vanette C22. The stroke was increased by 5 mm from the A14 engine to now measure 82 mm, while the bore remained 76 mm. It produces . It used only a different block casting number, but retained the same "tall-block" deck height, measurements and BMEP as the A14. In the Nissan B120 Sunny "RoadStar" truck it is capable of 49 mpg (17,3 km/L).

A fuel-injected version of the A15 (A15E) was offered in Asian markets.

Applications
 Nissan Sunny PB310 ("Datsun 210")
 Nissan Cherry F10 ("Datsun F10")
 Nissan B120 Pickup ("RoadStar" and "SportStar") in New Zealand
 1985-2009 Nissan Vanette C22
 Datsun 310 N10 in United States
 Nissan forklift: Replaced the commercial J15 engine from 1974 to 1978
 1988-2000 Grove-Manlift AMZ66 and AMZ56 (31kW, 42.5hp)

References

 SP Workshop Manual Series No. 111: Datsun 120Y, Sunny, B210, .
 Service Manual Model A10 and A12 Engine, Nissan Motor Co. Ltd, June 1971
 Datsun Sunny B310 Japan Domestic Market parts catalog, Nissan Motor Co. Ltd, October 1983

External links
 Datsun1200.com
 New Zealand Datsun Club
 Datsun 1200 Asia

See also
 List of Nissan engines

A
Gasoline engines by model
Straight-four engines